Borno State is a state in the North-East geopolitical zone of Nigeria, bordered by Yobe to the west, Gombe to the southwest, and Adamawa to the south while its eastern border forms part of the national border with Cameroon, its northern border forms part of the national border with Niger, and its northeastern border forms all of the national border with Chad, being the only Nigerian state to border three foreign countries. It takes its name from the historic emirate of Borno, with the emirate's old capital of Maiduguri serving as the capital city of Borno State. The state was formed in 1976 when the former North-Eastern State was broken up. It originally included the area that is now Yobe State, which became a distinct state in 1991.

Borno is the second largest in area of the 36 states, only behind Niger State. Despite its size, the state is the eleventh most populous with an estimated population of about 5.86 million as of 2016. Geographically, the state is divided between the semi-desert Sahelian savanna in the north and the West Sudanian savanna in the centre and south with a part of the montane Mandara Plateau in the southeast. In the far northeast of the state is the Nigerian portion of Lake Chad and the Lake Chad flooded savanna ecoregion; the lake is fed by the Yobe River which forms the state's border with Niger until it reaches the lakebed. In the centre of the state is part of the Chad Basin National Park, a large national park that contains populations of black crowned crane, spotted hyena, patas monkey, and roan antelope along with transient herds of some of Nigeria's last remaining African bush elephants. However, a section of the park, the Sambisa Forest, was taken over during the Boko Haram insurgency in the early 2010s forcing many fauna to flee; large animals were not seen until 2019 and 2020 when a massive herd of migratory elephants returned to Borno.

Borno State has been inhabited for years by various ethnic groups, including the Dghwede, Glavda, Guduf, Laamang, Mafa, and Mandara in the central region; the Afade, Yedina (Buduma), and Kanembu in the extreme northeast; the Waja in the extreme south; and the Kyibaku, Kamwe, Kilba, and Margi groups in the south while the Kanuri and Shuwa Arabs live throughout the state's north and centre. Religiously, the vast majority of the state's population (~85%) are Muslim with smaller Christian and traditionalist minorities (especially in the south) at around 7% each.

From the 700s, what is now Borno State was within the territory of the Kanem Empire, an empire spanning from modern-day southern Libya (Fezzan) south through most of now-Chad into modern-day Borno State. In the late 1300s, the Kanem Empire was forced to move after unsuccessful wars, becoming the Bornu Empire before regaining strength and ruling the  wider area for the next 500 years. It was not until the early 1800s when the Fulani jihad significantly weakened the Empire, that Bornu began to decline. Much of modern-day southern Borno State was seized in the wars and incorporated into the Adamawa Emirate under the Sokoto Caliphate. About 80 years later, Rabih az-Zubayr, a Sudanese warlord, conquered the Empire and ruled until he was killed by French forces in the 1900 Battle of Kousséri. The Adamawa Emirate was also defeated by colonial powers, losing the Adamawa Wars to Germany and the British Empire. Both Rabih's lands (later reconstituted as the Borno Emirate) and the Adamawa Emirate were then divided among colonial powers with modern-day Borno State being split between Germany and the British Empire.

The British-controlled area was incorporated into the Northern Nigeria Protectorate which later merged into British Nigeria before becoming independent as Nigeria in 1960. The German-controlled area (territory along the modern-day border with Cameroon) formed Deutsch-Bornu as a part of German Kamerun until allied forces invaded and occupied Kamerun during the Kamerun campaign of World War I. After the war, what is now the eastern periphery of Borno State became a part of the Northern Cameroons within the British Cameroons until 1961, when a referendum led to merger with Nigeria. Originally, modern-day Borno State was a part of the post-independence Northern Region until 1967 when the region was split and the area became part of the North-Eastern State. After the North-Eastern State was split, Borno State was formed on 3 February 1976 alongside ten other states. Fifteen years after statehood, a group of LGAs in the state's west was broken off to form the new Yobe State. Years later, in the early 2000s, the state became the epicentre of the Islamist group Boko Haram since it began its insurgency in 2009. From 2012 to 2015, the insurgency escalated dramatically with much of the state falling under the control of the group, which soon become the world's deadliest terror group in 2015 and forced millions from their homes. Following a 2015 mass multinational offensive along with infighting within the terrorists between the original Boko Haram group and the Islamic State – West Africa Province breakaway, the group was forced from its strongholds into the Sambisa Forest and some islands in Lake Chad by 2017; however, terrorists continue to be a threat statewide with frequent attacks on both civilian and military targets.

As a partially agriculturally-based state, the rural Borno State economy relied heavily on livestock and crops prior to the Boko Haram insurgency while state capital Maiduguri is a major regional trade and service center. However, after years of the insurgency affecting development and forcing farmers from rural areas in the state, Borno has the thirteenth lowest Human Development Index in the country but as the insurgency has slightly abated since 2016, development has renewed.

As of 2022, much of Borno State has been occupied by ISWAP.

History

The state has a predominance of Kanuri people, while other ethnic groups such as Lapang, Babur/Bura and Marghi are also found in the southern part of the state. Shuwa Arabs are mainly the descendants of Arab people and are an example of the endurance of traditional political institutions in some areas of Africa. The emirs of the former Kanem–Bornu Empire have played a part in the politics of this area for nearly 1,000 years.

The current Kanemi dynasty gained control of the Borno Emirate in the early 19th century after the Fulani jihad of Usman dan Fodio. Conquered by Rabih in 1893, The state was invaded by the British, French and Germans at the beginning of the 20th century. In 1902, the British officially incorporated Borno into the Northern Nigeria Protectorate and in 1907 established a new capital at Maiduguri, which remains the capital to this day.

After Nigerian independence in 1960, Borno remained fairly autonomous until the number of states in Nigeria expanded to 12 in 1967. Local government reform in 1976 further reduced the power of the emirs of the former dynasty, and by the time of Nigeria's return to civilian rule in 1979, the emirs' jurisdiction has been restricted solely to cultural and traditional affairs. Mala Kachallah was elected governor of Borno State in 1999 under the flagship of the then APP (All Peoples Party), later renamed the All Nigeria People's Party (ANPP). Ali Modu Sheriff was elected governor of Borno State in Nigeria in April 2003.

Boko Haram's insurgency began in 2009, with Borno being the worst-affected area. On 14 May 2013, President Goodluck Jonathan declared a state of emergency in northeastern Nigeria, including Borno State along with the neighboring states of Adamawa and Yobe. This happened after fighting between Boko Haram and the state armed forces killed 200 people in the town of Baga. A spokesman for the armed forces declared that the offensive would continue "as long as it takes to achieve our objective of getting rid of insurgents from every part of Nigeria."

In July 2014, the state's governor Kashim Shettima said that "176 teachers had been killed and 900 schools destroyed since 2011." After the Chibok schoolgirls kidnapping in April 2014, most schools in Borno State were closed.

In November 2014, UNICEF reported it has increased its Community Management of Acute Malnutrition (CMAM) centres in Borno State "from 5 to 67." In Borno State, the agricultural sector has suffered mostly because of the insurgency, and many people have experienced acute food insecurity.

Climate 
The climate of Borno state is characteristic of rainfall variability, with strong latitudinal zone, which is drier in this north eastern state. The commencement of the rainy season in this north-east state is around June/July of every year, which far behind the south eastern states. The trade wind, also regarded as the harmattan season is often experienced in the state between the months of December and February. There is a reduction in rainfall from 3,800 mm to below 650 mm in the state, hence it rains in the state between 4 to 5 months annually.  The state experiences high relative humidity annually. The hottest period in the state is in the month of May, with an average of 340C while the month of January is the coldest with an annual average of 230C. The wettest month is August with an average of 118.6 mm while the windiest month is December with an average of 11 km/h.

Education 
Borno has many higher institutions, these include:

 University of Maiduguri
 Nigerian Army University Biu
 Borno State University
 Al-Ansar University
 Kashim Ibrahim college of Education
 Mohammed Goni College of Legal and Islamic Studies
 School of Health and Technology Maiduguri
 Maiduguri Colege of Nursing and Midwifery

Local Government Areas

Borno State consists of twenty-seven (27) Local Government Areas, grouped into three Senatorial Districts (shown below with their areas and 2006 Census population figures):

In addition, there are eight Emirate Councils (Borno, Bama, Dikwa, Biu, Askira, Gwoza, Shani and Uba Emirates), which advise the local governments on cultural and traditional matters.

Languages
A wide variety of Biu–Mandara languages are spoken in Borno State, particularly in the Mandara Mountains.
Languages of Borno State listed by Local Government Area:

Other languages of Borno State are Lala-Roba, Tarjumo, Yedina, and Tedaga.

Religion
Islam is practiced in Borno State, with an equally few number of adherents of Christianity and other faiths. Sharia operates as the primary foundation for the development, interpretation, and enforcement of most civic codes and laws. The Roman Catholic Diocese of Maiduguri has its seat in the State. Ekklesiar Yan'Uwa A Nigeria (EYN) buildings in Maiduguri were destroyed by Boko Haram as a part of their uprising. The buildings were later rebuilt.

Notable people
Senator Kashim Shettima, Politician 
 Zakariya Maimalari, Nigerian soldier
 Mohammed Indimi, Business man
 Kyari Magumeri, soldier
 Fiona Lovatt, humanitarian
 Shaykh Sherif Ibrahim Ibn Saleh al-Hussaini, Islamic cleric and Mufti
 Abba Kyari Business man and politician
 Abba Kyari (military general), Military general

Natural resources 
Borno State is rich with abundant natural resorces, which are highly demanded by industries and for commercial purposes. These include:

 Kaolin
 Clay
 Diatomite
 Trona
 Natural salt
 Iron ore
 Silica sand
 Mica
 Quartz
 Magnetite
 Uranium

Companies/Industries 

 Borno textile 
 Flex foam Nigeria Limited
 Simba Industries Limited

See also
 Religion in Borno State
 Islamist insurgency in Nigeria

References

Sources

External links

 Boko Haram Fighting for their Last Territorial Stronghold, midwestdiplomacy.com, 23 April 2015

 
States and territories established in 1976
States of Nigeria